This is a discography for American rock band Widespread Panic. Since forming in 1986, Widespread Panic has released 12 studio albums, 8 live albums, 1 compilation album and 5 archive albums.

To date, Widespread Panic has sold over three million records.

Albums

Studio albums

Live albums

Compilation albums

Archive releases

Multi track recordings
Starting in June 2008, Widespread Panic began to release vintage concert performances from the Widespread Panic Archives. The band will continue to dig into their show archives, which encompasses the past 25 years, and release these shows as multi-track recordings.

Porch Songs
In December 2009, the band began releasing 2-track soundboard recordings of various archived shows.  Because soundboard recordings are less time-consuming than multi-tracks, this project, named Porch Songs, allows the band to deliver show recordings in a timely fashion while they continue to release 3–4 multi-track recordings a year.

Other appearances

References

External links
 Widespread Panic Discography

Discographies of American artists
Rock music group discographies